The fourth Sirisena cabinet was the central government of Sri Lanka led by President Maithripala Sirisena. It was formed in December 2018 following the end of the constitutional crisis and ended in November 2019 following the election of Sirisena's successor Gotabaya Rajapaksa.

Cabinet members
Ministers appointed under article 43(1) of the constitution.

Non-cabinet and state ministers
Ministers appointed under article 44(1) of the constitution.

Deputy ministers
Ministers appointed under article 45(1) of the constitution.

Notes

References

2018 establishments in Sri Lanka
2019 disestablishments in Sri Lanka
Cabinets established in 2018
Cabinets disestablished in 2019
Cabinet of Sri Lanka
Maithripala Sirisena